Thai Ullam is a 1952 Indian Tamil-language film directed by K. Ramnoth. Starring V. Nagayya, Manohar and R. Ganesh, the film has music composed by Nagayya and A. Rama Rao. It is an adaptation of the 1861 novel East Lynne, by Ellen Wood. The film was released on 9 February 1952, and emerged both a critical and commercial success.

Plot

Cast 

Male cast
 V. Nagayya as Zamindar Seethapathy
 Manohar as Manohar
 R. Ganesh as Sekar
 K. Ramasami as Clerk Kuppu
 N. Seetharaman as Magistrate Masilamani
 Chandra Babu as Sukumar
 Kolathumani as Ponnambalam
 C. V. V. Panthulu as Sabapathy

Female cast
 M. V. Rajamma as Nirmala
 Madhuri Devi as Vasundhara
 K. R. Chellam as Santhamma
 T. P. Muthulakshmi as Janaki
 Sakunthala as Singari
 C. K. Saraswathi as Kanthimathi

Supporting cast
T. K. Kalyanam, G. V. Sharma, Nandaram, Loose Arumugam, and V. T. Kalyanam.

Production 
K. Ramnoth, who had left Gemini Studios on 15 August 1947, worked for Narayanan & Company, for which he made the film Thai Ullam, an adaptation of the 1861 novel East Lynne by Ellen Wood. While Manohar was cast as the male lead, T. S. Balaiah was considered for playing the antagonist. He however opted out of the project after demanding a salary of 75,000, which he was refused. Subsequently, he was replaced by a then struggling actor named R. Ganesh, who later became known as Gemini Ganesan.

Soundtrack 
The songs were composed by Nagayya and A. Rama Rao, with lyrics by Kanakasurabhi, Subramania Bharati and Kavimani Desigavinayagam Pillai. The song "Vella Thamarai" is based on Bharati's poem of the same name. The song "Konjum Puraave" is based on the song "Thandi Hawayen" from the Hindi film Naujawan (1951). That, along with the songs "Kovil Muluthum Kanden", "Kathayai Kelada", "Vellai Thamarai" and "Poo Chendu Nee" attained popularity.

Release 
Thai Ullam was released on 9 February 1952, and distributed by Narayanan & Company themselves. The film was both a critical and commercial success, and a major breakthrough for Ganesh, who would later become a part of the "Big Three" of Tamil cinema, the other two being Sivaji Ganesan and M. G. Ramachandran.

References

External links 
 

1950s Tamil-language films
1952 films
Films based on British novels
Films directed by K. Ramnoth
Films scored by Nagayya
Films scored by A. Rama Rao